The Fond Parisien least gecko (Sphaerodactylus omoglaux) is a species of lizard in the family Sphaerodactylidae. It is endemic to Haiti.

References

Sphaerodactylus
Reptiles of Haiti
Endemic fauna of Haiti
Reptiles described in 1982
Taxa named by Richard Thomas (herpetologist)